Heterixalus tricolor is a species of frogs in the family Hyperoliidae endemic to Madagascar.
Its natural habitats are subtropical or tropical dry forests, moist savanna, subtropical or tropical seasonally wet or flooded lowland grassland, swamps, freshwater marshes, intermittent freshwater marshes, arable land, heavily degraded former forests, ponds, irrigated land, seasonally flooded agricultural land, and canals and ditches.

References

Heterixalus
Nepenthes infauna
Endemic frogs of Madagascar
Taxonomy articles created by Polbot
Amphibians described in 1881